Parahollardia is a genus of spikefishes native to the western Atlantic Ocean.

Species
There are currently 2 recognized species in this genus:
 Parahollardia lineata (Longley, 1935) (Jambeau)
 Parahollardia schmidti Woods, 1959

References

Tetraodontiformes
Taxa named by Alec Fraser-Brunner
Marine fish genera